Cassinia straminea is a species of flowering plant in the family Asteraceae and is endemic to eastern Australia. It is an erect shrub with hairy young stems, linear leaves and corymbs of up to several hundred flower heads.

Description
The upper surface of the leaves is glabrous, the edges are rolled under and the lower surface is densely covered with cottony hairs. Up to several hundred heads are arranged in each corymb.

Taxonomy and naming
This species was first formally described in 1867 by George Bentham who gave it the name Cassinia longifolia var. straminea in Flora Australiensis. In 2004, Anthony Edward Orchard raised the variety to species status as Cassinia straminea in Australian Systematic Botany.

Distribution
Cassinia straminea grows in forest and on the edges of rainforest on the Northern Tablelands of New South Wales and in south-east Queensland.

References

straminea
Asterales of Australia
Flora of New South Wales
Taxa named by George Bentham
Plants described in 1867